You Are My Destiny is a South Korean television series television series that aired on KBS1 from May 5, 2008, to January 9, 2009, on Mondays to Fridays at 20:25 for 178 episodes. Starring Im Yoon-ah, Park Jae-jung, Lee Ji-hoon and Gong Hyun-joo, the rating of the drama started at more than 20% in the first episode, and kept increasing. It reached a peak viewership rating of 41.6% in its final episode and was a huge success overall in Korea and many other Asian countries.

Im Yoon-ah is a member of the K-pop group Girls' Generation, and this was her first leading role.

Plot
Jang Sae-byuk is a cheerful and grateful orphan who always tries her best. She dreams of one day becoming an interior designer, despite her lack of education and money. Because of an accident that happened before the story starts (about three years ago), she loses her sight and undergoes corneal transplant surgery. Different events unravel when she encounters the Kim family, who has lost a daughter in a horrible car crash, unbeknownst to everyone besides the father and older brother. The stories then intertwine when Sae-byuk meets the Kim's extended family and the son of a big interior design company, Lohas, in Korea.

Cast
 Im Yoon-ah as Jang Sae-byuk, a milk delivering woman who finds her way through Lohas' design competition 
 Park Jae-jung as Kang Ho-sae, manager of Rohas, a company specializing in making kitchen sets
 Lee Ji-hoon as Kim Tae-pung
 Gong Hyun-joo as Kim Su-bin (Kim Tae-pung and Kim Tae-young's cousin) 
 Lee Pil-mo as Kim Tae-young. Tae-young is a teacher at a course institution
 Jang Yong as Kim Dae-jin (Tae-pung's father). Dae-jin owns a mover service company, Pung Express. Before establishing Pung Express, Dae-jin was the Kang family's driver.
 Jung Ae-ri as Oh Young-sook (Tae-pung's mother). Works at a food catering company owned by Lee Hwa-ran for some time. Used to work as a housemaid at the Kang family's house.
 Kim Hyo-seo as Kim Na-young (Tae-pung's deceased twin sister).
 Sa Mi-ja as Son Poong-geum (Dae-gu's and Dae-jin's mother)
 Kang Seok-woo as Kim Dae-gu (Su-bin's father). He worked as a mayor
 Lee Hye-sook as Hong Yeon-sil (Su-bin's mother). Nosy and gossipy.
 Lee Seol-ah as Kang Yu-ri (Ho-sae's sister).
 Hyun Seok as Kang Chil-bok (Ho-sae's father). Chil-bok is the president of Lohas.
 Yang Geum-seok as Seo Min-jung (Ho-sae's mother).
 Kim Hyung-il as Kang Charles (Chil-bok's brother / Yeon-sil's dance tutor) 
 Kim Jung-nan as Ban So-young (Tae-young's love interest and Yun-hui's single mother)
 Park Min-ji as Ban Yun-hui (So-young's daughter)
 Sunwoo Yong-nyeo as Lee Hwa-ran (So-young's mother). She owns a food catering company named "Sandeul Bada".
 Choi Won-young as Nam Gyeong-woo (Na-young's boyfriend). He survived the accident they were in together.
 Park Seul-gi as Bok-ju (Sae-byuk's best friend). Ditched Sae-byuk and stole her money. Sae-byuk later sees her in town and finds out why she left.
 Kwak Hyun-hwa as Oh Sun-jeong (female Lohas employee)
 Lee Jung-ho as Lee Dong-soo (male Lohas employee)
 Yoo Hye-ri as Jeong Mi-ok (Sae-byuk's biological mother)
 Jung Jae-gon as Jo Sang-ki (Yun-hui's biological father)
 Kim Sung-hoon as Jang Pan-jae (night sales manager)
 Shin Pyo as assistant director

Viewership
In the tables below, the blue numbers represent the lowest ratings and the red numbers represent the highest ratings. Source: AGB Nielsen

Awards
2008 2nd Korea Drama Awards
 Netizen Popularity Award: Im Yoon-ah

2008 KBS Drama Awards
 Netizen Award: Im Yoon-ah
 Best New Actress: Im Yoon-ah
 Excellence Award, Actor in a Daily Drama: Lee Pil-mo
 Excellence Award, Actress in a Daily Drama: Kim Jung-nan

2009 45th Baeksang Arts Awards
 Most Popular Actress (TV): Im Yoon-ah
 Best New Actress (TV): Im Yoon-ah

References

External links
  
 
 
 

Korean-language television shows
2008 South Korean television series debuts
2009 South Korean television series endings
Korean Broadcasting System television dramas
South Korean romance television series